Crassispira constricta is an extinct species of sea snail, a marine gastropod mollusk in the family Pseudomelatomidae, the turrids and allies.

Drillia (Crassispira) constricta (Edwards, 1861) is a homonym.

Description

Distribution
Fossils have been found in Miocene strata of Myanmar; age range: 37.2 to 20.43 Ma

References

External links
 E. Vredenburg. 1921. Comparative diagnoses of Pleurotomidae from the Tertiary formations of Burma. Records of the Geological Survey of India 53:83–129

constricta
Gastropods described in 1921